Lince may refer to:

Military vehicles
Lince (tank), a Spanish main battle tank in the 1990s
Lince (armored car), an Italian World War II armored car
Breda Ba.88 Lince, an Italian World War II ground-attack aircraft
VTLM Lince, the Italian name for the Iveco LMV tactical vehicle

Other uses
Lince District, a district of Lima
Lince Dorado, a Puerto Rican professional wrestler
 Lince Railway, short for Linhe–Ceke Railway in China's Inner Mongolia

See also 
Lynx